A Season finale is the final episode of a season of a television program

Season finale may also refer to:

Season Finale (book), 2007 book written by Suzanne Daniels and Cynthia Littleton
"Season Finale" (South Park), a 2019 episode of South Park

See also 
 Series finale